The El Paso Open was a golf tournament on the Ben Hogan Tour. It ran from 1990 to 1991. It was played at Coronado Country Club in El Paso, Texas.

In 1991 the winner earned $25,000.

Winners

Former Korn Ferry Tour events
Golf in Texas
Sports in El Paso, Texas
Recurring sporting events established in 1990
Recurring sporting events disestablished in 1991